National Mutual Insurance Company v. Tidewater Transfer Company, 337 U.S. 582 (1949), was a United States Supreme Court case that upheld the constitutionality of 28 U.S.C. §1332(d).  §1332(d) treats citizens of United States territories as citizens of a state for the purpose of establishing diversity jurisdiction.

References

External links
 

United States Supreme Court cases
United States Supreme Court cases of the Vinson Court
Diversity jurisdiction case law
1949 in United States case law